The UST Yellow Jackets (abbreviated as UST YJ or simply YJ) is the official pep squad and drumline of the University of Santo Tomas. It works together with the UST Salinggawi Dance Troupe, the official dance troupe of the university. It is the official cheerdance team, together with the UST Salinggawi Dance Troupe, of the University of Santo Tomas in the UAAP Cheerdance Competition. The UST Yellow Jackets also perform for halftime during the games of the UST Growling Tigers, the university's Men's Basketball team in the University Athletic Association of the Philippines.

The UST Yellow Jackets live by the motto, "Suaviter in Modo, Fortiter in Re".

History 
The organization was founded by Michael Ismael Flores (aka Ancient Mike) of Baliwag Bulacan, who first joined a dedicated P.E. Class-Cheering Squad (by his mentor Mr. Mike Silbor) in 1990 as a cheerleader. He was the first official resident cheerleader from 1990-1992. And in August 1993, he formed the  UST Bangers (all 8 pioneering members were initially hardcore head banging, ear pounding cheer drummers. Hence, the name "Bangers" was coined). The group was formed during the beginning of the 4peat era of the UST Men's Basketball. The UST Department of Physical Education, (now known as Institute of Physical Education & Athletics) officially and recognized his leadership and his team under the said name. However, GO USTE! was created by Ancient Mike in 1992. The original chant had a slower tempo and lower pitch (just like that of Vanilla Ice's Go Ninja).
In 1995, the first halftime cheer was done by a lone member of the group, Richie Medalla. It was at a women's basketball game, done over a dare to do the cheers of UST, traditional style.  Then soon others wanted in the action, cheering during pregame and halftime on the court. In 1997, the group became the official pep squad of the university under the name "UST Yellow Jackets" and was placed under UST's Institute of Physical Education and Sports (IPEA). Under IPEA, the organization was placed under the advisory of Prof. Robinson Laxa (1994-2007), Prof. Raymond Anselmo (2008–2016) and Mr. Teodoro Dela Peña (2016–Present).

The group got its name as suggested by Richie Medalla from the insect, Yellow Jacket which is part of the wasp family and known for their black and yellow stripes (the university colors of UST).

Logo 
The original logo of the UST Yellow Jackets was designed by Franco Cachero (Batch '97, '99).  It was a simple banner with the letters USTYJ on top and MDCXI at the bottom. The upper letters were larger than those on the lower part and the "UST" font was in white Times New Roman while the "YJ" font was in undefined yellow font. The "MDCXI" simply pertains to 1611, the year which UST was founded, in roman numerals. This was later changed to Est. 1993 which was the original date of the establishment of the organization under the name UST Bangers. A wasp, or the Yellow Jacket insect, was then added by Alfred Tanopo (Batch 2003) beneath the revised logo to further define the identity of the group.

Officers

Awards
The UST Yellow Jackets and the UST Salinggawi Dance Troupe, jointly, are tied with the UP Pep Squad for having the most number of UAAP Cheerdance Competition championships. As of today, both UST and UP have won 8 championships. They also have the longest championship run in the said competition with 5; from 2002 and 2006.

See also
 UST Growling Tigers
 Salinggawi Dance Troupe
 UAAP Cheerdance Competition

References 

Yellow Jackets
University Athletic Association of the Philippines pep squads